Treasury Tower  is a 279.5-meter-tall skyscraper at District 8 complex in Sudirman Central Business District (SCBD) in South Jakarta. As of October 2021, it is the third-tallest building in Jakarta. The architectural height of the tower is 279.5 meters and the top floor is situated at 260.6 meters. Construction was completed in 2016. Treasury Tower is one of three commercial office towers in District 8, which also comprises one hotel and seven residential apartment towers.

See also

District 8 Jakarta
List of tallest buildings in Indonesia
List of tallest buildings in Jakarta
List of tallest buildings in Asia

References 

Office buildings completed in 2016
2016 in Indonesia
Towers in Indonesia
Buildings and structures in Jakarta
Skyscrapers in Indonesia
Post-independence architecture of Indonesia
Skyscraper office buildings in Indonesia